The American Waltham was produced from 1898 to 1899 by the American Waltham Manufacturing Co., a bicycle firm based in Waltham, Massachusetts. It was a typical light steam buggy, with a 2-cylinder engine under the seat, tiller steering and cycle-type wheels. It is not to be confused with the more famous Waltham or Waltham Orient steamer, which was made by another bicycle maker at the same time. The company built only a handful of cars before returning full-time to the production of bicycles.

References

External links
 1898 American Waltham steam car

Companies based in Waltham, Massachusetts
Defunct motor vehicle manufacturers of the United States
Steam cars
Motor vehicle manufacturers based in Massachusetts